Havok Vision Game Engine is a discontinued, cross-platform, 3D game engine originally authored by Trinigy and later acquired by Havok. It was first released in 2003, and saw its final release in 2014. As of its eighth version, available target platforms were Microsoft Windows (DX9, DX10, DX11), Xbox 360, PlayStation 3, Nintendo Wii and Wii U, iOS, Android, Sony's PlayStation Vita, and most major browsers (IE6 and up, Firefox 2.0 and up, Google Chrome, Opera 9 and up).

Trinigy and its Vision Engine were acquired by Havok in 2011. Vision Engine has since been discontinued with no support being provided.

Games using Vision Engine

Licensing 
Havok licensed the Vision engine on a royalty-free, per-title/per-platform basis. All licenses included full support and regular technology updates. WebVision was free for any studio licensing Vision Engine 8.

References

External links 
 Havok Official website

2003 software
Microsoft
Video game engines